Deh-e Bid or Deh Bid may refer to:
 Deh Bid, alternate name of Safashahr, Fars Province
 Deh Bid, Arsanjan, Fars Province
 Dehbid, Marvdasht, Fars Province
 Deh Bid, Sepidan, Fars Province
 Deh Bid, Kohgiluyeh and Boyer-Ahmad
 Deh-e Bid Pichab, Kohgiluyeh and Boyer-Ahmad Province

See also
 Dahbed, Uzbekistan